Zachary Kenneth Thompson (born January 18, 1991) is an American football outside linebacker who is a free agent. He played college football at Wake Forest. He was signed by the New York Jets as an undrafted free agent in 2014.

Early years
Thompson attended Stone Bridge High School in Ashburn, Virginia. In high school, he played for his father, Mickey Thompson, who played at the University of Virginia. In 2008, he was selected to the All-Met first-team and was selected to the Class 5A all-state first-team as a defensive lineman. He was selected to the All-Liberty District first-team in both positions as a tight end and defensive end. He was selected to the Washington Post Loudoun All-Extra team in back to back seasons in 2007 and 2008.

College career
In his junior season, he was named as the ACC Defensive Lineman of the Week after recording 12 tackles against Army on September 24, 2012. He finished college with a total of 153 Tackles, 10 Sacks, 2 Interceptions and 2 Forced fumbles.

Professional career

New York Jets
Thompson was signed by the New York Jets as an undrafted free agent on May 11, 2014. He was released on August 30, 2014.

Denver Broncos
Thompson was added to the Denver Broncos' practice squad on September 1, 2014.

Baltimore Ravens 
On December 16, 2014, the Baltimore Ravens signed Thompson to their practice squad. On December 23, 2014, the Baltimore Ravens cut Thompson from their practice squad. On January 12, 2015, Thompson signed a reserve/future contract with the Baltimore Ravens. On September 5, 2015, the Baltimore Ravens placed Thompson on Injured Reserve. On December 7, 2015, the Baltimore Ravens waived Thompson.

References

External links
Wake Forest bio

1991 births
Living people
American football defensive ends
Wake Forest Demon Deacons football players
New York Jets players
Denver Broncos players
Players of American football from Virginia
People from Ashburn, Virginia